The Men's 400 meters hurdles at the 2011 All-Africa Games took place on 12 and 13 September at the Estádio Nacional do Zimpeto.

Medalists

Records
Prior to the competition, the following records were as follows.

Schedule

Semifinals
Qualification: First 3 in each heat (Q) and the next 2 fastest (q) advance to the Final.

Final

References

External links

400 meters hurdles